Space opera is a subgenre of science fiction.

Space Opera may also refer to:

Media
 Space Opera (role-playing game), a science-fiction RPG created by Edward E. Simbalist, A. Mark Ratner, and Phil McGregor
 Space Opera, a 1987 album by French composer and musician Didier Marouani
 "Space Opera", a first-season episode of the American musical children's television series Jack's Big Music Show

Literature
 Space Opera (1974 anthology), anthology of classic science fiction short stories edited by Brian Aldiss
 Space Opera (1996 anthology), anthology of science fiction short stories and novelettes edited by Anne McCaffrey and Elizabeth Scarborough
 Space Opera (Valente novel), a 2018 science fiction novel by Catherynne Valente
 Space Opera (Vance novel), a 1965 science fiction novel by the American science fiction author Jack Vance
 "Space Opera", a 1961 short story written by Ray Russell

Other
 Space opera in Scientology, the Xenu story and other doctrines of Scientology

See also
 The New Space Opera, a science fiction anthology edited by Gardner Dozois and Jonathan Strahan
 The New Space Opera 2, a science fiction anthology edited by Gardner Dozois and Jonathan Strahan
 Newton's Wake: A Space Opera, a science fiction novel by British writer Ken MacLeod